Zonia Meigham (born 11 June 1954) is a Guatemalan sprinter. She competed in the women's 400 metres at the 1984 Summer Olympics.

References

External links
 

1954 births
Living people
Athletes (track and field) at the 1975 Pan American Games
Athletes (track and field) at the 1984 Summer Olympics
Guatemalan female sprinters
Guatemalan female middle-distance runners
Pan American Games competitors for Guatemala
Olympic athletes of Guatemala
Place of birth missing (living people)
Olympic female sprinters